Citybus Limited is a bus company which provides both franchised and non-franchised service in Hong Kong. The franchised route network serves Hong Kong Island, cross-harbour routes (between Hong Kong Island and Kowloon/New Territories), North Lantau (Tung Chung and Hong Kong Disneyland), Hong Kong International Airport, Kowloon, New Territories, Shenzhen Bay Port and Hong Kong–Zhuhai–Macau Bridge Hong Kong Port. The non-franchised routes serve mainly City One Sha Tin. It also provides bus rental services and staff bus services for some large companies such as TVB and China Light and Power.

From 1984 to 2001 the company offered a cross-border service between Hong Kong and Mainland China using mainly Leyland Olympians, but this was discontinued due to stiff competition. However, in 2007, Citybus began operating route B3, which goes to Shenzhen Bay Port.

Since August 2020, the company is wholly owned by Bravo Transport which also owns the third largest operator, New World First Bus (NWFB). Prior to this, both NWFB and Citybus were owned by NWS Holdings and its predecessors. On 1 July 2023, the NWFB operations will be merged into Citybus.

History
Citybus was founded on 5 August 1979 by former China Motor Bus employee Lyndon Rees with one Volvo B55 double deck bus, providing a shuttle service for the Hong Kong United Dockyard in Hung Hom. In 1981, it commenced operating a residential bus route between City One Shatin and Kowloon Tong MTR station, which provided a innovative "breakfast bus" service. In 1982, the United Transport group purchased a 49% shareholding.

In 1984, Citybus began a cross-boundary coach service between Hong Kong and Shenzhen with ex National Trabel West and West Yorkshire Passenger Transport Executive Eastern Coach Works bodied Leyland Olympians. In 1985, the company introduced five air-conditioned Olympian coaches. Since then it has continued to expand its fleet of air-conditioned buses.

In the late 1980s, Citybus was purchased by Tsui Tsin-tong's CNT Group. It commenced operating residential bus services with 100 new Olympians linking housing estates to MTR stations.

In December 1990, Citybus launched Capital Citybus in London with an all-yellow livery for the routes in North and East London and a red and yellow livery for central London.
This was sold to FirstGroup in July 1998 and renamed First Capital.

In 1991, the Hong Kong Government awarded Citybus its first franchised route, 12A (Admiralty Tamar Street to Macdonnell Road) on Hong Kong Island, which was originally operated by China Motor Bus and then withdrawn in the 1980s.

In September 1993, Citybus took over 26 franchised routes from China Motor Bus after winning a competitive tender. These were branded as Network 26. To operate these a fleet of 101 Leyland Atlanteans was purchased from Singapore Bus Service. A further 14 franchised routes were awarded to the company in 1995 without tendering, with the fleet now expanded to more than 500 buses. During these years Citybus expanded its penetration of the Hong Kong Island market pushing nearly all China Motor Bus routes into low profitability.

In 1996, with the Tsing Ma Bridge coming into operation and commencement of settlement in the Tung Chung new town, Citybus won another tender to operate 13 new franchised routes serving Tung Chung and the new Hong Kong International Airport. In 1998 the airport Cityflyer service commenced, which is part of Citybus and is solely used for Airport express routes to the city. The Cityflyer service consisted of a series of four routes: A11, A12, A21 and A22, with A10 being added in 2006. Citybus also operates various Overnight Airport routes and Airport Shuttle Routes.

In 1998, following the expiry of the franchise of China Motor Bus, a further 12 routes were transferred to Citybus. Citybus's fleet was up to 1,100 buses. The remaining routes of China Motor Bus were transferred to a new operator, New World First Bus.

Its business was expanded into mainland China with a joint venture operation in Beijing through Citybus (China) Limited. It was not only Beijing's first joint venture bus operation, but it also marked the introduction of air-conditioned buses for the first time in the capital city. Following the success of this route, a second urban express coach route was introduced in Beijing. However, the services in Beijing were terminated shortly after the disposal of shares of Citybus (China) Limited from Citybus to Kingsman Global Limited, another Hong Kong company, in June 2004. Citybus had also once operated a route (route 658) in Tianjin. The service is now operated by another company after Citybus disposed all its interest in Citybus (China) Limited.

In July 1999, Citybus was purchased by Stagecoach Group of Scotland. In 2001, the cross-boundary coach service between China and Hong Kong was discontinued.

In June 2003, Stagecoach Group sold Citybus to Chow Tai Fook Enterprises, the parent company of the major rival operator New World First Bus. After a series of restructurings, Citybus became a subsidiary of NWS Holdings, which was also the parent company of New World First Bus and New World First Ferry.

In August 2020, along with New World First Bus, Citybus was sold to the Bravo Transport consortium, made up of private equity firm Templewater Bravo, Hong Kong-listed investment holding company Hans Energy and British bus operator Ascendal Group. The founder of Ascendal Group, Adam Leishman, also became the CEO of Bravo Transport.

In July 2022, Bravo Transport announced that it would be discontinuing the New World First Bus brand, and the NWFB operations will be merged into Citybus on 1 July 2023 when the bus franchises are renewed.

Services
As of 2015 Citybus operates 108 routes.

It currently operates two franchises:

Cityflyer

Cityflyer is a subsidiary of Citybus that primarily operates airport coach services. The service was started during the opening of the Hong Kong International Airport in 1998. This service is operated exclusively using 110 Alexander Dennis Enviro500 MMCs and 3 Alexander Dennis Enviro500s as of 30/5/2019. Citybus is currently in ownership of more Cityflyer-designated vehicles but said vehicles have yet to enter service. The vehicles contain exclusive features that cannot be found on the rest of the fleet, including luggage racks equipped with Closed-circuit television, blinds, USB charging ports and more comfortable padded seats with wider legroom

Fleet
As of 2020, the fleet consisted of 1013 buses, of which 950 are Double-decker buses and the remaining 63 are single-decker. Most are from British or European manufacturers, such as Alexander Dennis and Volvo Buses, but most single-deckers have been ordered from mainland Chinese manufacturers including Youngman and BYD Auto.

Depots
Operations are divided into two main departments, each of which have depots across the areas that they cover.

Operation Department One
Chai Wan (CWD) – 38 Sheung on Street
Wong Chuk Hang (WCD) – Next to Aberdeen Police Office
Ocean Park (OPD) -Next to Ocean Park MTR Station

Operation Department Two
West Kowloon (WKD) – Hing Wah Street West off West Kowloon Highway
Siu Ho Wan (SHD) – Sham Fung Road off North Lantau Expressway
Tuen Mun (TMD) – Hoi Wong Road near Tuen Mun Swimming Pool LR Stop
Tung Chung (TCD) – Opposite to Yat Tung Estate

Gallery

References

External links

Citybus and New World First Bus Company website 
Bus Fan World
A Chinese news report on the termination of Citybus's service in Beijing

Bus companies of Hong Kong
 
Companies formerly listed on the Hong Kong Stock Exchange
NWS Holdings
Transport companies established in 1979
1979 establishments in Hong Kong